Osteochilus kuekenthali is a species of cyprinid fish endemic to Borneo. It is sometimes considered conspecific with Osteochilus kelabau.

References

Taxa named by Ernst Ahl
Fish described in 1922
Osteochilus